The 45th Biathlon World Championships were held in Ruhpolding, Germany, from 1 to 11 March 2012.

There were total of 11 competitions held: sprint, pursuit, individual, mass start and relay races for men and women, and a mixed relay. All events during the championships also counted for the 2011–12 Biathlon World Cup season.

Schedule of events 
The schedule of the event stands below. All times in CET.

Medal winners

Men

Women

Mixed

Medal table

Top nations

Top athletes
All athletes with two or more medals.

References

External links 

IBU

 
2012
Biathlon World Championships
Biathlon World Championships 2012
Qualification events for the 2014 Winter Olympics
2012 in biathlon
2012 in Bavaria
Biathlon competitions in Germany
March 2012 sports events in Europe
Sports competitions in Bavaria